The 1910 Ice Hockey European Championship was the first ice hockey tournament for European countries associated to the International Ice Hockey Federation. It was also the first official ice hockey tournament between national teams in history.
 
The tournament was played between January 10, and January 12, 1910, in Les Avants, near Montreux, Switzerland, and it was won by Great Britain.

The British team was commonly identified as "England" in contemporary accounts, but the IIHF recognizes this team as "Great Britain."

The Oxford Canadians, a team made up of Canadian students from Oxford University, also participated in the tournament, but their games did not count in the final standings of the tournament. They took part in three games, against Switzerland, Belgium, and Germany, winning all of them handily. On the final day of the tournament, the schedule was changed due to poor ice conditions. Great Britain was not prepared to play the Canadians at the new time, and the organizers declared this a forfeit.

Results
January 10

January 11

January 12

Oxford Canadians won by forfeit.

Final standings

Top Goalscorer
Werner Glimm (Germany), 4 goals

References

 Euro Championship 1910

 
1910
Ice Hockey European Championships
Euro
European Championship
Ice Hockey European Championship